Chatusadom or Catustambha (literally "Four Pillars" from Sanskrit Catur "Four" + Stambha "Pillars") was the Thai system of central executive governance during the Ayutthaya Kingdom, Thonburi Kingdom and Rattanakosin Kingdom from 1454 to 1892. For about four hundred years, it had served as the constitution of central government of Siam or Thailand until King Chulalongkorn organized Chatusadom into modern ministries and officially established the Cabinet on April 1, 1892.

The Chatusadom system
King Trailokanat promulgated the constitution of Chatusadom in his Palatine Law, or Phra aiyakan tamnaeng na phonlaruean, with the promulgation date being 1454. The original written law had been lost, however. Chatusadom went through subsequent amendments over time and King Rama I enacted the Palatine Law in the Three Seals Law, from which the Chatusadom was mostly studied.

The Chatusadom bureaucracy was divided into Phonlaruean or Civil Affairs and Thahan or Military Affairs. Chatusadom was led by two Prime Ministers, alternatively Grand Chancellors who held the rank of Chao Phraya;

Below Samuha Nayok in Civil affairs were the Four Ministries, from which Chatusadom'''s name was derived. Each ministry was led by a Senabodi or Minister who held the rank of Phraya and each ministry had a Thai and a Sanskrit-derived name.

These four ministers were collectively called Vieng-Wang-Klang-Na. The Senabodi ministers of the Four Ministries held the rank of Phraya in the Ayutthaya period. However, during the late Ayutthaya and Bangkok period the ranks of these ministers rose to Chao Phraya.

History and subsequent amendments
The Four Ministries of Chatusadom or Vieng-Wang-Klang-Na had existed in Ayutthaya before 1455. Each ministry was called Krom and the ministers held the rank of Khun. The chancellor of the executives in Early Ayutthaya was called Senabodi ( from Sanskrit Senapati) who oversaw the Ministries. King Trailokanat organized and institutionalized the Four Ministries into bureaucratic apparatus in the Palatine Law of 1454. The Four Ministers were raised to the rank of Phraya and the Ministries were given Sanskrit-derived names. The executives was led by two prime ministers; the Samuha Nayok and the Samuha Kalahom, who performed administrative duties on behalf of the king in Civil and Military Affairs, respectively. The officials were divided into Civil and Military divisions. However, as time progressed, the distinction between Civil and Military divisions became blurred and all official including Civil officials were expected to perform military duties especially during the wars. The two prime ministers and four ministers had their own offices and each office had a long list of functionaries.

After King Trailokanat, auxiliary departments were added to the apparatus to meet the demands. King Ramathibodi II established the Krom Phra Suratsawadi or the Registration Department in 1518 to specifically oversee the census of manpower for more efficient levy and conscription. After the conclusion of a trade treaty with the Portuguese in 1511, Phra Khlang Sinkha or Royal Warehouse was established within the Ministry of Treasury to deal with foreign trades, in which the royal court held the monopoly. In the seventeenth century, the trade with Western nations grew and the Kromma Tha or the Ministry of Pier, formerly a department within the Ministry of Treasury, rose to importance and the term Kromma Tha became quite synonymous with Krom Klang.

The position of Samuha Kalahom had grown powerful by the mid-Ayutthaya period as he controlled military forces. Okya Kalahom Suriyawongse the Samuha Kalahom usurped the throne and ascended as King Prasat Thong in 1629. The power imbalance and potential threat from some ministers led the kings to reconsider and amend the Chatusadom bureaucracy. King Prasat Thong transferred the Cavalry and Elephant Regiments from Samuha Kalahom to Samuha Nayok. Some kings preferred not to appoint Samuha Nayok or Samuha Kalahom to avoid creating powerful nobles, most notably King Narai, who instead assigned the duties and responsibilities of the two prime ministers to his ministers without officially investing them with titles and honors.

The greatest reform of Chatusadom came during the reign of King Phetracha. King Phetracha, who faced rebellions in Nakhon Ratchasima and Nakhon Si Thammarat that took nearly three years to quell, sought to reduce the power of regional governors. He expanded the authority of Chatusadom to the regional level and redefined the two prime ministers. The Samuha Nayok became the Prime Minister of Northern Siam in both Civil and Military affairs while the Samuha Kalahom became the Prime Minister of Southern Siam. The division between the two prime ministers went from "functional" to "regional". King Phetracha also assigned the coastal port cities to the Kromma Tha. Siam was then divided among the three ministers and the city governors were to report to the minister of their respective regions. The Minister of Trade or "Phraklang" also grown exceptionally powerful due to participation in foreign trades. By the eighteenth century in the Late Ayutthaya, three most powerful ministers of Siam were the Samuha Nayok, the Samuha Kalahom and Phraklang the Minister of Trade.

King Borommakot, who ascended the throne in 1733 after a civil war with his nephews, transferred the cities of the Samuha Kalahom who had declared neutrality in the civil war to Chaophraya Chamnan Borrirak the Minister of Trade who was his ardent supporter. The Southern Siamese cities were then transferred from Kalahom to Kromma Tha. The Samuha Kalahom became a powerless figure. After the Fall of Ayutthaya in 1767, Thonburi and Rattanakosin kingdoms inherited the whole Chatusadom apparatus of the Late Ayutthaya period. King Rama I restored the Southern Siamese cities to the authority of Samuha Kalahom in 1782. The seals of top three ministers were stamped on the Three Seals Law. King Rama I who was formerly Chao Phraya Chakri the Samuha Nayok established the Chakri dynasty. The Samuha Nayoks of the Rattanakosin period were then not known as "Chao Phraya Chakri", which was the generic titile of Samuha Nayok, but instead known from their individualized title names, most famously Chao Phraya Bodindecha.

By the late nineteenth century, the Chatusadom system was inadequate for the modernizing Siam. King Chulalongkorn and Prince Damrong gradually re-organized and transformed the Chatusadom ministries into the ministries in modern, Western sense. Firstly, the Phraklang ministry was separated into the Ministry of Finance and Ministry of Foreign Affairs in 1875. Each ministry was called Krasuang instead of Krom, which became a term for subordinate departments. The reforms culminated in 1892 when King Chulalongkorn announced the official establishment of modern Cabinet comprising twelve ministries on April 1, 1892. The Krom Mahatthai of Samuha Nayok became the Ministry of Interior and Krom Kalahom became the Ministry of Defence, thus ending the Chatusadom'' system.

See also
Thai nobility
Sakdina
List of samuhanayok
List of samuhakalahom

References

15th-century establishments in Thailand
1892 disestablishments in Siam
Political history of Thailand
Ayutthaya Kingdom